Brandon Jordan may refer to:

 Brandon Jordan (gridiron football) (born 1988), American football player in the Canadian Football League
 Brandon Jordan, founding guitarist for punk rock band Killradio